Wat Ounalom (UNGEGN: , ALA-LC: , ; also Wat Unnalom and several other spellings) is a wat located on Sisowath Quay in Phnom Penh, Cambodia, near the Royal Palace of Cambodia. As the seat of Cambodia's Mohanikay Order, it is the most important wat of Phnom Penh, and the center of Cambodian Buddhism. It was established in 1443 and consists of 44 structures. It was damaged during the Khmer Rouge period but has since been restored. The main complex houses a stupa that contains what is believed to be an eyebrow hair of Lord Buddha and an inscription in Pali.

Etymology
The name of Wat Ounalom commemorates one of the holiest relics in Cambodia, a hair (lom) from the whorl (unna) between the eyebrows of the Buddha.

Gallery

References

15th-century Buddhist temples
Buddhist temples in Phnom Penh
Religious buildings and structures completed in 1443